Russell S. Copeland (born November 4, 1971) is a former American football wide receiver in the National Football League (NFL) for the Buffalo Bills, Green Bay Packers, and the Philadelphia Eagles.  He played college football at the University of Memphis, where he was teammates with future NFL hall of fame receiver Isaac Bruce.  In three seasons, Copeland caught 116 passes for 1,753 yards and 12 touchdowns, while adding another 536 yards returning punts and kickoffs.  He was selected by the Bills in the fourth round of the 1993 NFL draft.

In his rookie season, Copeland gained 952 all-purpose yards, assisting his team to a championship appearance in Super Bowl XXVIII.  His best season was in 1995, when he caught 42 passes for 646 yards and a touchdown.  Copeland finished his career with 103 receptions for 1,463 yards and 2 touchdowns, and 2,270 all-purpose yards.

After his career in the NFL, Copeland played 1 game for the Toronto Argonauts of the Canadian Football League (CFL) in 2001. While with the Buffalo Bills, Russell would hit the drum solo to Phil Collins' song, "In the Air Tonight" on point during pregame warmups at then, Rich Stadium

References

External links
Just Sports Stats

1971 births
Living people
Sportspeople from Tupelo, Mississippi
American football wide receivers
Memphis Tigers football players
Buffalo Bills players
Green Bay Packers players
Philadelphia Eagles players
Memphis Maniax players
Toronto Argonauts players